In mathematics, the sign of a real number is its property of being either positive, negative, or zero. Depending on local conventions, zero may be considered as being neither positive nor negative (having no sign or a unique third sign), or it may be considered both positive and negative (having both signs). Whenever not specifically mentioned, this article adheres to the first convention.

In some contexts, it makes sense to consider a signed zero (such as floating-point representations of real numbers within computers). In mathematics and physics, the phrase "change of sign" is associated with the generation of the additive inverse (negation, or multiplication by −1) of any object that allows for this construction, and is not restricted to real numbers. It applies among other objects to vectors, matrices, and complex numbers, which are not prescribed to be only either positive, negative, or zero.

Sign of a number
Numbers from various number systems, like integers, rationals, complex numbers, quaternions, octonions, ... may have multiple attributes, that fix certain properties of a number. A number system that bears the structure of an ordered ring contains a unique number that when added with any number leaves the latter unchanged. This unique number is known as the system's additive identity element. For example, the integers has the structure of an ordered ring. This number is generally denoted as  Because of the total order in this ring, there are numbers greater than zero, called the positive numbers. The numbers in each such pair are their respective additive inverses. Since rational and real numbers are also ordered rings (in fact ordered fields), the sign attribute also applies to these number systems.

When a minus sign is used in between two numbers, it represents the binary operation of subtraction. When a minus sign is written before a single number, it represents the unary operation of yielding the additive inverse (sometimes called negation) of the operand. Abstractly then, the difference of two number is the sum of the minuend with the additive inverse of the subtrahend. While  is its own additive inverse, the additive inverse of a positive number is negative, and the additive inverse of a negative number is positive. The plus sign is predominantly used in algebra to denote the binary operation of addition, and only rarely to emphasize the positivity of an expression.

In common numeral notation (used in arithmetic and elsewhere), the sign of a number is often made explicit by placing a plus or a minus sign before the number. For example,  denotes "positive three", and  denotes "negative three" (algebraically: the additive inverse of ). Without specific context (or when no explicit sign is given), a number is interpreted per default as positive. This notation establishes a strong association of the minus sign "" with negative numbers, and the plus sign "+" with positive numbers.

Sign of zero
Within the convention of zero being neither positive nor negative, a specific sign-value  may be assigned to the number value . This is exploited in the -function, as defined for real numbers. In arithmetic,  and  both denote the same number . There is generally no danger of confusing the value with its sign, although the convention of assigning both signs to  does not immediately allow for this discrimination.

In some contexts, especially in computing, it is useful to consider signed versions of zero, with signed zeros referring to different, discrete number representations (see signed number representations for more).

This notation refers to the behaviour of a function as its real input variable approaches  along positive (resp., negative) values; the two limits need not exist or agree.

Terminology for signs

When  is said to be neither positive nor negative, the following phrases may refer to the sign of a number:
 A number is positive if it is greater than zero.
 A number is negative if it is less than zero.
 A number is non-negative if it is greater than or equal to zero.
 A number is non-positive if it is less than or equal to zero.

When  is said to be both positive and negative, modified phrases are used to refer to the sign of a number:
 A number is strictly positive if it is greater than zero.
 A number is strictly negative if it is less than zero.
 A number is positive if it is greater than or equal to zero.
 A number is negative if it is less than or equal to zero.

For example, the absolute value of a real number is always "non-negative", but is not necessarily "positive" in the first interpretation, whereas in the second interpretation, it is called "positive"—though not necessarily "strictly positive".

The same terminology is sometimes used for functions that yield real or other signed values. For example, a function would be called a positive function if its values are positive for all arguments of its domain, or a non-negative function if all of its values are non-negative.

Complex numbers
Complex numbers are impossible to order, so they cannot carry the structure of an ordered ring, and, accordingly, cannot be partitioned into positive and negative complex numbers. They do, however, share an attribute with the reals, which is called absolute value or magnitude. Magnitudes are always non-negative real numbers, and to any non-zero number there belongs a positive real number, its absolute value. 

In general, any arbitrary real value can be specified by its magnitude and its sign. Using the standard encoding, any real value is given by the product of the magnitude and the sign in standard encoding. This relation can be generalized to define a sign for complex numbers.

Since the real and complex numbers both form a field and contain the positive reals, they also contain the reciprocals of the magnitudes of all non-zero numbers. This means that any non-zero number may be multiplied with the reciprocal of its magnitude, that is, divided by its magnitude. It is immediate that the quotient of any non-zero real number by its magnitude yields exactly its sign. By analogy, the  can be defined as the quotient  and its  The sign of a complex number is the exponential of the product of its argument with the imaginary unit. represents in some sense its complex argument.

Sign functions

When dealing with numbers, it is often convenient to have their sign available as a number. This is accomplished by functions that extract the sign of any number, and map it to a predefined value before making it available for further calculations. For example, it might be advantageous to formulate an intricate algorithm for positive values only, and take care of the sign only afterwards.

Real sign function
The sign function or signum function extracts the sign of a real number, by mapping the set of real numbers to the set of the three reals  It can be defined as follows:

Complex sign function
While a real number has a 1-dimensional direction, a complex number has a 2-dimensional direction. The complex sign function requires the magnitude of its argument , which can be calculated as

Let  be also expressed by its magnitude and one of its arguments  as  then

This definition may also be recognized as a normalized vector, that is, a vector whose direction is unchanged, and whose length is fixed to unity. If the original value was R,θ in polar form, then sign(R, θ) is 1 θ. Extension of sign() or signum() to any number of dimensions is obvious, but this has already been defined as normalizing a vector.

Signs per convention

In situations where there are exactly two possibilities on equal footing for an attribute, these are often labelled by convention as plus and minus, respectively. In some contexts, the choice of this assignment (i.e., which range of values is considered positive and which negative) is natural, whereas in other contexts, the choice is arbitrary, making an explicit sign convention necessary, the only requirement being consistent use of the convention.

Sign of an angle

In many contexts, it is common to associate a sign with the measure of an angle, particularly an oriented angle or an angle of rotation. In such a situation, the sign indicates whether the angle is in the clockwise or counterclockwise direction. Though different conventions can be used, it is common in mathematics to have counterclockwise angles count as positive, and clockwise angles count as negative.

It is also possible to associate a sign to an angle of rotation in three dimensions, assuming that the axis of rotation has been oriented. Specifically, a right-handed rotation around an oriented axis typically counts as positive, while a left-handed rotation counts as negative.

Sign of a change
When a quantity x changes over time, the change in the value of x is typically defined by the equation

Using this convention, an increase in x counts as positive change, while a decrease of x counts as negative change. In calculus, this same convention is used in the definition of the derivative. As a result, any increasing function has positive derivative, while any decreasing function has negative derivative.

Sign of a direction
In analytic geometry and physics, it is common to label certain directions as positive or negative. For a basic example, the number line is usually drawn with positive numbers to the right, and negative numbers to the left:

As a result, when discussing linear motion, displacement or velocity, a motion to the right is usually thought of as being positive, while similar motion to the left is thought of as being negative.

On the Cartesian plane, the rightward and upward directions are usually thought of as positive, with rightward being the positive x-direction, and upward being the positive y-direction. If a displacement or velocity vector is separated into its vector components, then the horizontal part will be positive for motion to the right and negative for motion to the left, while the vertical part will be positive for motion upward and negative for motion downward.

Signedness in computing

In computing, an integer value may be either signed or unsigned, depending on whether the computer is keeping track of a sign for the number. By restricting an integer variable to non-negative values only, one more bit can be used for storing the value of a number. Because of the way integer arithmetic is done within computers, signed number representations usually do not store the sign as a single independent bit, instead using e.g. two's complement.

In contrast, real numbers are stored and manipulated as floating point values. The floating point values are represented using three separate values, mantissa, exponent, and sign. Given this separate sign bit, it is possible to represent both positive and negative zero. Most programming languages normally treat positive zero and negative zero as equivalent values, albeit, they provide means by which the distinction can be detected.

Other meanings

In addition to the sign of a real number, the word sign is also used in various related ways throughout mathematics and other sciences:
For real numbers, it means that only the absolute value  of the quantity is known.
 The sign of a permutation is defined to be positive if the permutation is even, and negative if the permutation is odd.
 In graph theory, a signed graph is a graph in which each edge has been marked with a positive or negative sign.
 In mathematical analysis, a signed measure is a generalization of the concept of measure in which the measure of a set may have positive or negative values.
 In a signed-digit representation, each digit of a number may have a positive or negative sign.
 The ideas of signed area and signed volume are sometimes used when it is convenient for certain areas or volumes to count as negative. This is particularly true in the theory of determinants. In an (abstract) oriented vector space, each ordered basis for the vector space can be classified as either positively or negatively oriented.
 In physics, any electric charge comes with a sign, either positive or negative. By convention, a positive charge is a charge with the same sign as that of a proton, and a negative charge is a charge with the same sign as that of an electron.

See also 
 Plus–minus sign
 Positive element
 Signed distance
 Signedness
 Symmetry in mathematics

References 

Elementary arithmetic
Numbers
Mathematical terminology